Stedman is a surname and given name. Notable people with the name include:

Surname
 Arthur Stedman (1868–1958), British architect
 Bert Stedman (born 1956), American politician from Alaska
 Charles Stedman (1753–1812), British Army officer, writer, and historian
 Charles Harrison Stedman (1805–1866), American medical society founder
 Charles Manly Stedman (1841–1930), politician and lawyer from North Carolina
 Daniel Stedman, American filmmaker
 Edith G. Stedman (1888-1978), American social worker and educator
 Edmund Clarence Stedman (1833–1908), American poet, critic, and essayist
 Edward Stedman (1842–1925), senior British Indian Army officer 
 Elizabeth Clementine Stedman (1810–1889), American writer
 Fabian Stedman (1640–1713), English originator of method ringing in bell ringing
 Fred Stedman (1870–1918), English cricketer
 Geoffrey Ernest Stedman (born 1943), New Zealand physicist
 Harry Stedman (1848–1904), English clergyman and cricketer
 Ivan Stedman (1895–1979), Australian swimmer
James Stedman, Member of Parliament
 John Stedman (disambiguation), multiple people, including:
 John Andrew Stedman (1778–1833), Dutch lieutenant-general during the Waterloo campaign
 John Gabriel Stedman (1744–1797), Dutch/British soldier
 Joseph F. Stedman (1898–1946), American religious leader and author
 Lincoln Stedman (1907–1948), American silent film actor
 Marshall Stedman  (1874–1943), American stage and silent screen actor/director, playwright, author and drama teacher
 Michael Stedman (disambiguation), multiple people, including:
 Michael Stedman (journalist) (born 1985), Australian political reporter
 Myrtle Stedman (1883–1938), American actress
 Phyllis Stedman, Baroness Stedman (1916–1996), British politician
 Ray Stedman (1917–1992), American religious leader
 Seymour Stedman (1871–1948), American jurist and activist
 Thomas Lathrop Stedman (1853–1938), American medical doctor and authority
 Troy Stedman (born 1965), American football linebacker
 William Stedman (1765–1831), U.S. Representative from Massachusetts

Given name
 Stedman Bailey (born 1990), American football wide receiver
 Stedman Graham (born 1951), American educator, author, businessman, speaker, and partner of Oprah Winfrey
 Stedman Pearson (born 1964), English singer and dancer
 Stedman Prescott (1896–1968), American jurist who served on the Supreme Court of Maryland

See also
Steadman (name)

de:Stedman
it:Stedman